and  are a pair of action role-playing video game for the PlayStation Portable and Nintendo DS, respectively. Both games were localized and released as Dungeon Explorer: Warriors of Ancient Arts in the United States and as Dungeon Explorer in Europe. The games are related to the PC Engine game Dungeon Explorer. Both are action role-playing games. They feature wireless connectivity to allow multiple players to connect to each other, and Jashin no Ryouiki also allows for online play using Nintendo Wi-Fi Connection on the Nintendo DS.

Gameplay 

The bulk of the storyline for Dungeon Explorer: Warriors of Ancient Arts takes place in various dungeons. Each dungeon is unlocked after various quests are completed by acquiring "plates" and can be leveled up by inserting jewels in said plates. Each level is more challenging than the previous one and can be selected at any given time. At one point Dungeon level progression is stopped until an item called a Sirius Jewel is acquired, a reusable item that unlocks further dungeon empowerment. Specific levels have specific challenges in them, such as Level 6 of a dungeon are considered blind; without the usage of a specific item, the mini-map is blanked out with only the character icons visible.

The title features 3 races and 6 classes that the player can choose from the beginning. From a certain point on, the character has the option to change classes when he is not in the dungeons, each one keeping its own ranks (from "E" to "S"). There are also 6 advanced classes that require the combination of two basic classes: one with rank B and the other with rank A. These advanced classes include the skills of the previous two classes plus new own abilities and unique weapons. All of these skills are acquired as characters level up their range of weapons as well as their range of work, and two of them can be equipped and changed on the fly.

The jewels have multiple purposes in addition to powering up dungeons, they can be consolidated, used in alchemy or installed onto weapons are armor. These jewels are elemental in nature and match each element of the dungeons, which follow a planetary theme (Neptune, Saturn, Jupiter, etc.). In addition, each element has a status ailment associated with it.

Synopsis

Development

Release

Reception 

Dungeon Explorer: Warriors of Ancient Arts was met with mixed reception from critics and reviewers alike since its release.

Notes

References

External links 
 Dungeon Explorer: Warriors of Ancient Arts at GameFAQs
 Dungeon Explorer: Warriors of Ancient Arts at Giant Bomb
 Dungeon Explorer: Warriors of Ancient Arts (DS) at MobyGames
 Dungeon Explorer: Warriors of Ancient Arts (PSP) at MobyGames

2007 video games
Action role-playing video games
Nintendo DS games
PlayStation Portable games
Role-playing video games
Video games developed in Japan
Video games featuring female protagonists
Rising Star Games games
Multiplayer and single-player video games
Hudson Soft games